David Sears is the name of:

David Sears (America) (1787–1871), Boston philanthropist, merchant, and landowner
David Sears (racing driver), former racing driver
David O. Sears (born 1935), social and political psychologist, professor at the University of California, Los Angeles
Dave Sears (American football executive), assistant general manager of the Arizona Cardinals

See also
David Sears House